Adrift on the Nile (Thartharah fawqa al-Nīl) is a 1966 book by Egyptian author and Nobel Laureate Naguib Mahfouz. The novel was later made into a 1971 film, Chitchat on the Nile.

The book follows Anis Zani who smokes kief every night with a group of friends on a houseboat on the Nile. Anis works as a civil servant but soon finds his life encumbered by his drug use. The book explores nihilism and spiritual emptiness.

Plot summary 

The book starts out with Anis Zani, the protagonist, being disciplined by his boss for submitting a blank report. It's revealed that Anis wrote the report under the influence of drugs, which prevented him from realizing his pen was out of ink. Anis and a group of fellow addicts get together every night to smoke keif on a houseboat on the Nile. Samara, a young journalist, visits the group in order to report on them. The tranquility of the group collapses as they begin to argue about topics like love, morality and purpose. The downfall of the group is accelerated when, one night as they are  taking a midnight excursion by car, they hit a person and flee the scene.

Awards  
 The Nobel Prize in Literature 1988

References  

1966 novels
Arabic-language novels
Nile in fiction
Novels by Naguib Mahfouz